Alan White (21 December 1946 – 5 August 2020), known as Chip White, was an American jazz drummer who has performed and/or recorded with a variety of artists, including Carmen McRae, Jaki Byard, the Jazzmobile CETA Big Band, Candido, John Abercrombie, Frank Wess, and many others.

White died on August 5, 2020, in Harlem, New York City.

Early life 
White was born on December 21, 1946, in New York City. He began studying percussion and music with his father at the age of nine and studied theory and harmony with Vincent Corzine while in high school. Mr. White then continued his formal education at Ithaca College and later at the Berklee School of Music in Boston, MA, where he studied with Alan Dawson, Charlie Marino, and Herb Pomeroy. He also studied privately with Freddie Buda of the Boston Symphony. Later, he studied orchestration and arranging with Frank Foster.

Discography 
Source: 

Harlem Sunset (Postcards, 1994)
Music and Lyrics (Dark Colors, 2004)
Double Dedication (Dark Colors, 2008)
More Dedications (Dark Colors, 2009)
Personal Dedications & Percussive Tributes (Dark Colors, 2011)
Family Dedications and More (Dark Colors, 2014)

As sideman 

With Teddy Edwards
Midnight Creeper (HighNote, 1997)
Ladies Man (HighNote, 2000)
Smooth Sailing (HighNote, 2001 [2003])
With Etta Jones
Easy Living (HighNote, 2000)
The Way We Were: Live in Concert (Highnote, 2000 [2011]) with Houston Person
Etta Jones Sings Lady Day (HighNote, 2001)
With Houston Person
Christmas with Houston Person and Friends (Muse, 1994)
In a Sentimental Mood (HighNote, 2000)
Social Call (HighNote, 2003)
To Etta with Love (HighNote, 2004)
All Soul (HighNote, 2005)
With Enrico Rava
Il Giro Del Giorno in 80 Mondi (International, 1972)
With Irene Reid
One Monkey Don't Stop No Show (Savant, 2002)
With Tom Waits
Blue Valentine (Asylum, 1978)

References

External links 
Discogs
Allmusic

American jazz drummers
American jazz composers
American male jazz composers
1946 births
2020 deaths
Musicians from New York City
Place of birth missing
20th-century American drummers
American male drummers
Jazz musicians from New York (state)
20th-century American male musicians
Berklee College of Music alumni
Ithaca College alumni